Mist Mountain is a mountain located alongside Highway 40 in the Canadian Rockies of Alberta, Canada.

The mountain was named in 1884 by George M. Dawson.

Mist Mountain is composed of sedimentary rock that was pushed east and over the top of younger rock during the Laramide orogeny.


Climate
Based on the Köppen climate classification, Mist Mountain is located in a subarctic climate with cold, snowy winters, and mild summers. Temperatures can drop below −20 °C with wind chill factors below −30 °C.

In terms of favorable weather, June through September are the best months to climb Mist Mountain.

Precipitation runoff from the mountain drains into tributaries of the Highwood River.

See also 
 Mist Mountain Formation

References

External links
 
 Mist Mountain weather: Mountain Forecast

Three-thousanders of Alberta
Alberta's Rockies